Buckley Lake, elevation , is a small lake in Peterborough County of Southern Ontario, Canada. It is located just east of Lakefield in the Sawer Creek wetland.

References

Lakes of Peterborough County